Mozart may refer to:
Mozart, Desha County, Arkansas
Mozart, Stone County, Arkansas